is a former Japanese football player.

Club statistics

References

External links

1984 births
Living people
Association football people from Kyoto Prefecture
Japanese footballers
J2 League players
Japan Football League players
Mito HollyHock players
Iwate Grulla Morioka players
SP Kyoto FC players
Ococias Kyoto AC players
Association football forwards